The Vietnamese Rangers, commonly known as the ARVN Rangers, were the light infantry of the Army of the Republic of Vietnam. Trained and assisted by American Special Forces and Ranger advisers, the Vietnamese Rangers infiltrated beyond enemy lines in search and destroy missions. Initially trained as a counter-insurgency light infantry force by removing the fourth company each of the existing infantry battalions, they later expanded into a swing force capable of conventional as well as counter-insurgency operations, and were relied on to retake captured regions. Later during Vietnamization the Civilian Irregular Defense Group program was transferred from MACV and integrated as Border Battalions responsible for manning remote outposts in the Central Highlands.

Rangers were often regarded as among the most effective units in the war. Part of this was due to the specialized role of these units, given that they had their origins in French-raised Commando Units, the GCMA which were drawn from Viet Minh defectors and Tai-Kadai groups, operating in interdiction and counter-intelligence roles, and were trained specifically for counter-insurgency and rough-terrain warfare in the region. Ranger Units often had a US Military Adviser attached to these units although operated independently. With improvements in the ARVN from 1969 onward and the growing prestige of the Airborne and Marine Division, depredation had caused the Central Highlands-based Rangers to become manned by deserters, released convicts and Montagnards nevertheless the unit continued to operate in the Easter Offensive and frontier skirmishes in 1973 and 1974.

History

The French established a commando school in Nha Trang in 1951. After the American Military Assistance Advisory Group took over the military advisory role, the school was converted to a Ranger school in 1956. In 1960, when the Vietnam War began in earnest, the Vietnamese Rangers were formed. Rangers (Biet Dong Quan [BDQ]) initially organized into separate companies with U.S. Army Rangers were assigned as advisers, initially as members of the Mobile Training Teams (MTTs), at Ranger Training Centers (RTC), and later at the unit level as members of the Military Advisory Command Vietnam (MACV). A small number of Vietnamese Ranger officers were selected to attend the U.S. Army Ranger School at Ft. Benning.

In 1962, BDQ companies were initially formed into counter-insurgency Special Battalions but by 1963 Ranger units were organized into battalions and their mission evolved from counter-insurgency to light infantry operations.

In late December 1964 elements of the 29th, 30th, 33rd, 35th and 38th Ranger Battalions took part in the Battle of Binh Gia with the 30th and 33rd Rangers suffering severe losses.

In May 1965 in the Battle of Sông Bé the 34th and 36th Rangers drove out a VC force occupying the town.

On 30 May 1965 in the Battle of Ba Gia the 39th Ranger Battalion was part of a task force with ARVN 2nd Battalion, 51st Infantry Regiment, 25th Division, the 3rd Marine Battalion and one squadron of M113 armored personnel carriers to recapture Ba Gia which had been captured the previous day by the VC. The VC first attacked the 2nd Battalion, 51st Infantry and then ambushed the 3rd Marine Battalion as it attempted to support the 2/51st forcing both units to retreat to Phuoc Loc. On the morning of 31 May the VC renewed their attacks capturing Phuoc Loc and attacking the 39th Rangers inflicting heavy casualties. Total South Vietnamese losses were 392 men killed and missing.

On the afternoon of 10 June 1965 during the Battle of Đồng Xoài, the 52nd Ranger Battalion was landed by helicopter 3 kilometres south of Đồng Xoài. While the lead company was ambushed by VC suffering heavy losses, the unit pushed on into Đồng Xoài reinforcing the defenders in the camp and repelling several night attacks by the VC.

From 20–21 October 1965 the 22nd and 96th Ranger Battalions assisted in lifting the Siege of Plei Me.

On 8 December 1965 the 11th Ranger Battalion participated in Operation Harvest Moon/Lien Ket 18 in the Quế Sơn Valley with the ARVN 1st Battalion, 5th Regiment 2nd Division and the US 3rd Marine Division's Task Force Delta. On the morning of 8 December the ARVN began their advance along Route 534 with the 1st Battalion on the left of the road and the 11th Rangers on the right. At 13:30 the Rangers walked into an ambush by the VC 70th Battalion which was overrun within 15 minutes, losing a third of their men, the remainder withdrew and established a defensive perimeter 1.2 km northwest and called for air support. The 1st Regiment was prevented from reinforcing the Rangers by intensive small arms and mortar fire and Marine airstrikes hit the VC positions. Later that day HMM-161 helicopters flew in the ARVN 6th Regiment, 2nd Division from Tam Kỳ to replace the 11th Rangers. The operation concluded on 20 December, the Marines had lost 45 killed, the ARVN 90 killed and 91 missing and the VC 407 killed and 33 captured.

From 5–7 March 1966 in Operation Utah the 37th Ranger Battalion assisted the ARVN 1st and 5th Airborne Battalions and elements of the US 1st Marine Division in fighting the People's Army of Vietnam (PAVN) 21st Regiment northwest of Quảng Ngãi.

From 2–21 June 1966 in Operation Hawthorne the 21st Ranger Battalion participated with the US 101st Airborne Division in relieving the ARVN 42nd Regiment, 22nd Division which was fighting the PAVN 24th Regiment near the village of Toumorong, Kon Tum Province.

During 1966, the battalions were formed into task forces, and five Ranger Group headquarters were created at Corps level to provide command and control for tactical operations. The Ranger Group structure was maintained until 1970 as U.S. force reduction commenced. The Civilian Irregular Defense Group (CIDG) situated along the Laotian and Cambodian borders, formerly under control of 5th U.S. Special Forces Group, was integrated into the Ranger command. Thus, the Rangers assumed an expanded role of border defense. The conversion of CIDG camps to 37 combat battalions with 14,534 men, more than doubled the Ranger force size.

From June to 15 December 1967 in Operation Fairfax the 5th Ranger Group participated with the US 199th Infantry Brigade in joint counterinsurgency/pacification operations in Gia Định Province, near Saigon. Total VC losses were over 1200 killed or captured.

From 26–30 May 1967 the 1st Ranger Group conducted Operation Lien Ket 106 with the ARVN 6th Regiment, 2nd Division and in coordination with the US 5th Marine Regiment's Operation Union II in the Quế Sơn Valley against the PAVN 2nd Division.

From 27–31 July 1967 the 44th Ranger Battalion participated in Operation Coronado II with the ARVN 3rd Marine Battalion and the US Mobile Riverine Force against VC units in the Mekong Delta.

On 10 September 1967 the 37th Ranger Battalion encountered a PAVN force north of the Operation Swift area in the Quế Sơn Valley. The Rangers lost 13 killed and 9 missing while the PAVN lost 70 killed. On the evening of 13 September the PAVN attacked the 37th Rangers again and additional ARVN units and 1st Battalion, 5th Marines and 3rd Battalion, 5th Marines were airlifted to support them. By dawn the PAVN disengaged leaving 49 dead while the Rangers has lost 15 killed.

On 26 January 1968 the 37th Ranger Battalion was flown into Khe Sanh Combat Base to fight alongside the US 26th Marine Regiment in the Battle of Khe Sanh in a move more for political than tactical reasons. In late February, ground sensors detected the PAVN 66th Regiment, 304th Division preparing to mount an attack on the positions of the 37th Ranger Battalion on the eastern perimeter of the base. On the night of 28 February, the base unleashed artillery and airstrikes on possible PAVN staging areas and routes of advance. At 21:30, the attack came on, but it was stifled by the small arms of the Rangers, who were supported by thousands of artillery rounds and airstrikes. Two further attacks later in the morning were halted before the PAVN finally withdrew. The PAVN, however, were not through with the ARVN troops. Five more attacks against their sector were launched during March.

During the Tet Offensive battle of Cholon and Phu Tho Racetrack from 31 January-11 February 1968 the 30th, 33rd and 38th Ranger Battalions were all involved in the fighting. During the Tet Offensive attacks on Bien Hoa and Long Binh from 31 January to 2 February 1968 the 3rd Ranger Task Force, consisting of the 35th and 36th Ranger Battalions, provided a rapid reaction force supported by 2 155-mm howitzer battalions located on the southeast of Bien Hoa and together with elements of the ARVN 5th Division which had its headquarters there successfully defended the headquarters and other key facilities in the Bien Hoa-Long Binh complex.

In the mopping up operations of the Battle of Hue on 25 February a two Battalion Ranger task force recaptured the Gia Hoi sector between the east wall of the Huế Citadel and the Perfume River.

From 8 April to 31 May 1968 the 5th Ranger Group participated in Operation Toan Thang I to continue pressure on PAVN/VC forces in III Corps after the successful Operation Quyet Thang. The operation involved nearly every combat unit in III Corps. The operation was a success with allied forces claiming 7645 VC/PAVN killed, however the operation did not prevent the PAVN/VC from launching their May Offensive attacks against Saigon.

On 6 May 1968 during the May Offensive the 30th and 33rd Ranger Battalions joined with US Cavalry forces to attack a hamlet west of Phú Thọ Racetrack in Saigon meeting heavy resistance they withdrew and called in air and artillery strikes, on entering the hamlet the next morning they counted over 200 VC dead. On 7 May the 35th Ranger Battalion, who had established a cordon with the National Police north of Cholon, were ordered to attack VC positions to the north. They were met by heavy fire including B-40 rockets described by their US adviser as "coming in like hail". The Rangers withdrew to allow airstrikes against the VC and assaulted again but were again stopped by heavy fire. On 8 May the 38th Ranger Battalion relieved the 35th Rangers and attempted to restart the advance but made little progress until aided by US Cavalry forces. The assault slowly continued on 9 May finding 45 VC dead. On 10 May the 33rd Rangers swept the area around Phú Thọ Racetrack finding 9 VC dead and various weapons and supplies. On 11 May the 38th Rangers continued advancing to the north supported by airstrikes. The VC began to disengage across Saigon and the attack was largely over. The 3/4 Cavalry withdrew from the area and its area of operations was taken over by the Rangers.

On 31 August during the Phase III Offensive south of Da Nang the 21st and 37th Ranger Battalions trapped a PAVN unit in a bend of the Song Ky Lam River with the 3rd Battalion, 5th Marines on the opposite bank killing 80 PAVN with 1 captured for the loss of 7 ARVN dead and 45 wounded. At 20:00 Company H 2/5th Marines ambushed 30 PAVN as they attempted to cross the Song Ky Lam on boats, killing all on board.

From 7 December 1968 to 8 March 1969 the 1st Ranger Group participated in Operation Taylor Common with the US 1st Marine Division's Task Force Yankee in the An Hoa basin, Quảng Nam Province against the PAVN/VC Base Area 112. ARVN losses were 100 killed and 378 wounded, PAVN/VC losses were 1,398 killed and 29 captured.

From 26 May to 7 November 1969 the 37th Ranger Battalion participated in Operation Pipestone Canyon with the 1st and 2nd Battalions, 51st Regiment and the US 1st Marine Division against PAVN/VC base areas on Go Noi Island southwest of Da Nang.

On 27 April 1970 a Ranger Battalion had advanced into Kandal Province, Cambodia to destroy a PAVN base in the first operation of the Cambodian Campaign On 30 April, as part of Operation Toan Thang 42 (Total Victory) three Ranger battalions and other ARVN forces crossed into the Parrot's Beak region of Svay Rieng Province.

From 5 January to 30 May 1971 the 74th Ranger Battalion and 11th Armored Cavalry Regiment conducted operations in the Snuol District of Cambodia, culminating in the Battle of Snuol from 25–30 May 1971 resulting in 37 ARVN killed and 74 missing for 1043 PAVN killed.

From 8 February to 25 March 1971 the 21st and 39th Battalions of the 1st Ranger Group participated in Operation Lam Son 719. The two battalions developed firebases north and south of Route 9 in Laos to serve as tripwires for any PAVN advance into the zone of the ARVN incursion. On 18 February PAVN forces began attacks by fire on bases Ranger North and South. On 19  February the attacks commenced against Ranger North conducted by the 102nd Regiment, 308th Division supported by Soviet-built PT-76 and T-54 tanks. The ARVN held on tenaciously throughout the night. By the afternoon of the 20th, the 39th Ranger Battalion had been reduced from 500 to 323 men and its commander ordered a retreat toward Ranger South, six kilometers away. Only 109 survivors reached Ranger South by nightfall. Although more than 600 PAVN troops were estimated as killed during the action, casualties in the three-day fight totaled 75 percent of the ARVN battalion. PAVN attention then shifted to Ranger South, where 400 ARVN troops, including the 109 survivors of Ranger North, held the outpost for another two days before General Lãm ordered them to fight their way five kilometers southeast to FSB 30.

Easter Offensive
On the morning of 3 April 1972 Firebase Delta 25 km northwest of Kontum, defended by one company of Airborne and one of Rangers came under attack by the PAVN 52nd Regiment, the assault was repulsed using intensive tactical airstrikes and the PAVN suffered 353 killed. On 21 April the PAVN launched an assault on Firebase Delta by 3 tanks supported by infantry and by the evening had succeeded in overrunning the base.

At the start of the Battle of An Lộc on 13 April 1972, An Lộc was defended by the 3rd Ranger Group; the 5th Division (less one battalion); Task Force 52 (2nd Battalion, 52nd Infantry Regiment and the 1st Battalion, 48th Infantry Regiment), 500 men; as well as Binh Long Provincial Regional Force, Popular Forces and People's Self-Defense Forces (PSDF), about 2,000 men. The initial attack on the town was repulsed by airpower and skillful use of M72 LAW rockets against PAVN tanks. The second assault on 15 April was also repulsed and the defenders were reinforced by the arrival of the 1st Airborne Brigade and 81st Ranger Group. The PAVN bombarded the town and gradually reduced the defensive line, while all the time being battered by US and South Vietnamese airstrikes. On 11 May the PAVN 5th and 9th Divisions launched a massive all-out infantry and armor assault on An Lộc, suffering severe losses to airstrikes but further squeezing the defenders. Another assault on 12 May failed to take the city. The PAVN launched a final attack on 19 May in honor of Ho Chi Minh's birthday. The attack was broken up by U.S. air support and an ambush by the Airborne. After the attacks of 11 and 12 May the PAVN directed its main efforts to cutting off any more relief columns. However, by 9 June this proved ineffective, and the defenders were able to receive the injection of manpower and supplies needed to sweep the surrounding area of PAVN and by 18 June the battle was over.

In May 1972 during the Battle of Kontum after overrunning the ARVN bases at Tân Cảnh, Đắk Tô and the Firebases along Rocket Ridge the PAVN turned their attention to Polei Kleng Camp and Ben Het Camp which blocked the avenues for attack on Kontum. Polei Kleng, defended by the 62nd Border Rangers, had been subjected to artillery fire since 24 April, but from midday on 6 May the volume of fire increased dramatically with over 500 rounds systematically destroying the base bunkers and an infantry assault by the PAVN 64th Regiment penetrated the perimeter. At 19:00 the two U.S. advisers at the base were evacuated by helicopter. The attack was repulsed and the ARVN continued to hold for a further 3 days during which time U.S. airpower, including gunships and 16 B-52 strikes, was concentrated on the attacking PAVN. On the night of 7 May the PAVN attempted another assault but were again repulsed suffering 300 killed. On the morning of 9 May the ARVN abandoned the base in the face of a PAVN tank and infantry assault, only 97 ARVN and their dependents reaching safety in Kontum. On 9 May, elements of the PAVN 203rd Armored Regiment assaulted Ben Het which was defended by the 85th Border Rangers and the 1st Squadron, 19th Armored Cavalry Regiment equipped with M41 tanks. The Rangers destroyed the first three PT-76 tanks with BGM-71 TOW missiles, thereby breaking up the attack. The Rangers spent the rest of the day stabilising the perimeter ultimately destroying 11 tanks and killing over 100 PAVN. In early May the 2nd and 6th Ranger Groups deployed along Route 14 north of Kontum were replaced by the 45th and 46th Regiments, 23rd Division. On 21 May the 2nd and 6th Ranger Groups supported by armored cavalry and engineer elements began an operation to clear Route 14 from Pleiku to Kontum which had been blocked by the PAVN 95B Regiment near Chu Pao Mountain. The attack was slowed by multiple PAVN ambushes and roadblocks and ultimately halted by the defenses at Chu Pao Mountain.

In late November the 3rd, 5th and 6th Ranger Groups replaced the 18th Division at An Lộc.

During the Battle of Tong Le Chon from 25 March 1973 to 12 April 1974 the 92nd Ranger Battalion at Tonle Cham Camp held out against a prolonged PAVN siege before finally being overrun.

The 11th Ranger Group had the responsibility for the defense of Sơn Tịnh District, but it was probably among the least effective units of this kind. With battalions that could muster only 225-300 men for operations, its performance was desultory at best. The Group's 68th Battalion typified the general lack of combat efficiency characteristic of the other two battalions, and for that matter, most of the 12 RF battalions in Quang Ngai. The 68th was driven from its dug-in positions on Hill 252 in the important Cong Hoa Valley approach to Quang Ngai City-in October by an inferior VC unit. After stalling in attempts to retake the hill, it was sent, somewhat as punishment for failure, to an active area south of Chu Lai. There on the night of 17 December, the 95th VC Sapper Company of Bình Sơn District infiltrated the sleeping battalion command post, caused over 50 casualties including the battalion commander and his deputy and carried away an 81-mm. mortar, eight PRC-25 radios, 15 M-16 rifles, five .45-caliber pistols and five binoculars.

From 30 October to 10 December 1973 the 21st Ranger Battalion together with the 23rd Division fought the Battle of Quang Duc, successfully defeating PAVN efforts to expand their logistical network from Cambodia.

From 27 March 1974 the 83rd Ranger battalion held the Đức Huệ camp against attack by the PAVN 5th Division which began the Battle of Svay Rieng. The Rangers successfully defended the camp and the 7th Ranger Group with other ARVN units attacked PAVN base areas in Svay Rieng Province, Cambodia.

From 18 July to 7 August 1974 Ranger units fought the PAVN 304th Division in the Battle of Thượng Đức.

From 18 July to 4 October 1974 the 78th Ranger Battalion and 12th Ranger Group, together with 3rd Division, fought the Battle of Duc Duc.

From 28 August to 10 December 1974 the 15th Ranger Group together with the 3rd and 51st Regiments, 1st Division fought the Battle of Phú Lộc forcing the PAVN back from hills overlooking Highway 1 and from which they could shell Phu Bai Air Base.

Organization

Corps Ranger Liaisons
There were Ranger liaison platoons of 45 to 52 men assigned to each ARVN Corps/CTZ headquarters. They were supposed to ensure the "proper use" of the Rangers.

Rangers
At their height in 1975 there were 54 Ranger battalions in 20 Groups. However, only 22 of these battalions, formed in 10 Groups, were actual Rangers while the rest were Border Rangers who were converted over during the Vietnamization from previous CIDG and MIKE Forces.

The following Ranger (Biêt Dông Quân) formations existed:
1st Ranger Group: 21st, 37th and 39th Ranger Battalions – Da Nang (I Corps/CTZ)
2nd Ranger Group: 11th, 22nd and 23rd Ranger Battalions – Pleiku (II Corps/CTZ)
3rd Ranger Group: 31st, 36th and 52nd Ranger Battalions – Biên Hòa (III Corps/CTZ)
4th Ranger Group: 42nd, 43rd and 44th Ranger Battalions – Chi Long (initially in the 44 Tactical Zone and later the IV Corps)
5th Ranger Group: 30th, 33rd and 38th Ranger Battalions – Biên Hòa (III Corps/CTZ)
6th Ranger Group: 35th, 51st and 54th Ranger Battalions – Biên Hòa (III Corps/CTZ)
7th Ranger Group: 32nd and 85th Ranger Battalions – Saigon, attached to Airborne Division
8th Ranger Group: 84th and 87th Ranger Battalions – Formed in 1974–75
9th Ranger Group: 91st and 92nd Ranger Battalions – Formed in 1974–75
81st Ranger Group: 81st Ranger Battalion (Airborne) – Biên Hòa

Additionally, during the Vietnamization of the CIDG and MIKE Forces, former CIDG units were namely given Ranger status and organized into groups mostly of 3 battalions each, but they were largely local forces without any special forces capabilities.
21st Ranger Group
22nd Ranger Group
23rd Ranger Group
24th Ranger Group
25th Ranger Group
31st Ranger Group
32nd Ranger Group
33rd Ranger Group
41st Ranger Border Defense Group – Chi Long HQ
42nd Ranger Border Defense Group – Chi Long HQ

The 3rd, 5th, and 6th Ranger Groups, all operational in the III Corps area, were grouped together into the Third Ranger Command through which the ARVN attempted to form another division, but the lack of enough heavy weapons prevented this from happening.

Border Rangers

A further 33 Ranger Border Defense Battalions also existed in 1973. These were the former CIDG units formed by the Americans and totaled 14,365 men. Border Ranger Battalions were smaller than their Ranger counterparts with 465 men versus the 575 to 650 of regular Rangers.

In existence by March 1975 were also the following new formations in the Central Highlands, made up of mainly the former Ranger Border Defense Battalions being now consolidated into Ranger Groups of three battalion each:

21st Ranger Group
22nd Ranger Group
23rd Ranger Group
24th Ranger Group
25th Ranger Group

The 81st Ranger Group
The 81st Ranger Group was a unique unit originally formed as part of the Project DELTA reaction force. Formed on 1 November 1964 as the 91st Airborne Ranger Battalion and consisted of three companies of Montagnards. A fourth company was added in 1965. It was reorganized in 1966 as the 81st Ranger Battalion by the "purging of non-Vietnamese" to make it more "effective". The 81st consisted of six all-Vietnamese companies. It was officially under Army of the Republic of Vietnam Special Forces (LLDB) command and not that of Ranger Command. It was actually under the direct control of Project DELTA although two companies were made available to the LLDB.

Training

Ranger courses were established at three training sites in May 1960: Da Nang, Nha Trang, and Song Mao. The original Nha Trang Training course relocated to Dục Mỹ in 1961 and would become the central Ranger-Biêt Dông Quân-Company and Battalion sized unit training was later established at Trung Lap; to ensure a consistently high level of combat readiness, BDQ units regularly rotated through both RTC's. Graduates of the school earned the Ranger badge with its distinctive crossed swords.

Ranger Training Centers conducted tough realistic training that enabled graduates to accomplish the challenging missions assigned to Ranger units. Known as the "steel refinery" of the ARVN, the centers conducted training in both jungle and mountain warfare.

Uniforms and equipment
The Rangers wore all the uniforms that the ARVN wore, however they were known for their tightly tailored OG-107's and duck hunter camouflage uniforms. They wore a snarling black tiger superimposed over a large yellow star painted in front of their helmets. Many wore a painted black and yellow striping pattern on their helmets. Many rangers also wore a red bandana.

The Rangers wore brown/maroon berets worn pulled to the left in the French-style with a badge containing a winged arrow in a wreath was worn over the right ear. This beret was also worn by American and Australian Army advisers with the unit.

Commendation 
A total of 11 U.S Presidential Unit Citation (United States) were issued to the 22 original Ranger Battalions, including one unit whom earned three total citations from two different presidents. See List of Non-US Presidential Unit Citations in Vietnam.

The foremost counterinsurgency expert Sir Robert Thompson remarked in 1974 that the ARVN as a whole were the third-best trained army in the free-world and second only to the Israelis in counter-insurgency, with the Rangers, ARVN Airborne and Marine Division forming the vanguard.

See also
 52nd Ranger Battalion (South Vietnam)

References

External links
About the ARVN Rangers
More about the ARVN Rangers
81st Ranger Veterans site
 

Army of the Republic of Vietnam
Military units and formations disestablished in 1975